Więcław may refer to the following places:
Więcław, Gmina Barlinek in West Pomeranian Voivodeship (north-west Poland)
Więcław, Gmina Dębno in West Pomeranian Voivodeship (north-west Poland)
Więcław, Świdwin County in West Pomeranian Voivodeship (north-west Poland)